The AFC Champions League is a seasonal association football competition that was established in 1967. It begins in January or February and ends with the finals in November of the same year. The AFC Champions League is open to the league champions and cup winners of Asian Football Confederation member associations, as well as to the clubs finishing in second and third position in the stronger leagues of each zone. Prior to the 2002–03 season, the tournament was named the Asian Club Championship. Originally, only the champions of their respective national league and the defending champion of the competition were allowed to participate. However, this was changed in 2002 to allow the national cup winners to compete as well.

Al-Hilal hold the record for the most victories, with four wins since the competition's inception. Thai Farmers Bank, Pohang Steelers, Suwon Samsung Bluewings and Al-Ittihad are the four teams that managed to win the competition consecutively. Al-Hilal has contested the most finals, eight, winning four and losing four, while Al-Ahli, FC Seoul and Persepolis are the only three clubs to reach the finals more than once without winning. Overall, 24 clubs have won the competition since its inception in 1967. Clubs from South Korea have won the most titles with 12. Japanese clubs are second with seven, and Saudi Arabian clubs are third with six wins. The current champions are Al-Hilal, who beat Pohang Steelers 2–0 in the 2021 final.

List of finals

 The "Year" column refers to the season the competition was held, and wikilinks to the article about that season.
 Official season orthography of Asian Club Championship is reset. Both one-year and two-year seasons listed separately.
 Finals are listed in the order they were played.

Performances

By club

By nation

See also
List of Asian Club Championship and AFC Champions League winning managers
List of Asian Cup Winner's Cup finals

Notes

A.  The final was scratched and Maccabi Tel Aviv were awarded the championship after Aliyat Al-Shorta refused to play the Israeli side for political reasons.

B.  The championship was decided in a final group round-robin of four teams.

C.  The final was scratched and Yomiuri FC were awarded the championship as Al-Hilal was unable to field a team after several of their starting players were selected for the Saudi national team's preparation camp, which clashed with the first leg.

D.  Score was 1–1 after 90 minutes and extra time. Al-Hilal won the penalty-shootout 4–3.

E.  Score was 0–0 after 90 minutes and extra time. Pohang Steelers won the penalty-shootout 6–5.

F.  Score was 0–0 after 90 minutes and extra time. Suwon Samsung Bluewings won the penalty-shootout 4–2.

G.  Score was 2–2 after 90 minutes and extra time. Al-Sadd won the penalty-shootout 4–2.

References

finals
 
Asian